Consell Observatory ( and ; observatory code: 176) is an astronomical observatory owned and operated by the Latin American League of Astronomy.

Discoveries 
The discovery of asteroid  in 2004, is credited to the observatory.

See also 
 Astronomical Observatory of Mallorca (OAM)

External links 
 Consell Observatory (Spanish)

Astronomical observatories in Spain
Buildings and structures in Mallorca
Minor-planet discovering observatories